Cheung Yin-tung (born 1 May 1964) is a Hong Kong politician. He is the former secretary and treasurer of the Democratic Party and former member of the Yuen Long District Council.

Biography
He was a New Territories indigenous resident born in Yuen Long in 1964. He participated in student activism when he was younger and was chairman of the 32nd standing committee of the Hong Kong Federation of Students (HKFS) and led protests in support of the Tiananmen Square protests of 1989 in Beijing.

After he graduated, he became a teacher. He was invited by Meeting Point and United Democrats of Hong Kong legislator Ng Ming-yum to join the United Democrats, which later transformed into the Democratic Party. He was elected to the Yuen Long District Board in 1991 but was defeated by conservative Leung Che-cheung in Yiu Yau with a large margin in the 1994 re-election. He participated in the 1995 Regional Council election, running against Leung Che-cheung again but lost to Leung in a margin of 70 votes.

In the 2003 District Council election, he won a seat in the Wang Yat constituency, taking the first seat for the Democrats in Tin Shui Wai. In the 2004 Legislative Council election, he ran in the New Territories West with Albert Ho's ticket. Ho eventually won a seat but Cheung was unelected. He ran again in 2008 Legislative Council election, leading the third ticket for the Democratic Party along with Albert Ho and Lee Wing-tat. His ticket received 10,069 votes and was not elected.

He had been the Democratic Party secretary two terms, from 1998 to 2006 and from 2008 to 2014 and also the party treasurer from 2006 to 2008. Most of the Democratic Party leaders were denied access to the Mainland China due to its strained relationship with the Beijing government. As a Democratic Party secretary, Cheung was granted a 10-year Home Entry Permit to attend a course for District Councillors in 2005. He said he would hope there would be more formal liaison with mainland authorities.

He was responsible for the intra-party investigation over the allegation of some senior members were involved in spying activities of China in 2006, being the convenor of the five-member committee.

On 23 January 2015 after the party leadership election, Cheung Yin-tung resigned as secretary and his position on the Central Committee with his disciple Kwong Chun-yu. Some speculated their disaffections towards the dominance of the Mainstreamer faction led by the "triumvirate", Yeung Sum, Cheung Man-kwong and Lee Wing-tat.

References

1964 births
Living people
Hong Kong people of Hakka descent
People from Dabu
Hong Kong educators
District councillors of Yuen Long District
Members of the Urban Council of Hong Kong
Democratic Party (Hong Kong) politicians
United Democrats of Hong Kong politicians
Indigenous inhabitants of the New Territories in Hong Kong